The 2018 CS Finlandia Trophy was held in October 2018 in Espoo. It was part of the 2018–19 ISU Challenger Series. Medals were awarded in the disciplines of men's singles, ladies' singles, pair skating, and ice dancing.

Entries
The International Skating Union published the list on entries on September 7, 2018.

Changes to preliminary assignments

Results

Men

Ladies

Pairs

Ice dancing

References

CS Finlandia Trophy
2018 in Finnish sport